Branislav Fábry (born January 15, 1985) is a Slovak professional ice hockey player who currently plays for HC Nové Zámky in the Slovak Extraliga (Slovak). He was drafted by the Buffalo Sabres in the second round, 65th overall, of the 2003 NHL Entry Draft, however never pursued a North American career.

He has formerly played with HC Slovan Bratislava in the Slovak Extraliga. and HC Znojemští Orli in the past. Before enduring a stint with KLH Chomutov in the First National Hockey League.

His father was also a hockey player, and played the Junior Extraliga of ice hockey in Czechoslovakia.

Career statistics

Regular season and playoffs

International

References

External links
 

1985 births
Living people
Buffalo Sabres draft picks
HC Nové Zámky players
HC Prešov players
HC Slovan Bratislava players
MHK Kežmarok players
MsHK Žilina players
Orli Znojmo players
Orlik Opole players
Piráti Chomutov players
Slovak ice hockey forwards
Sportovní Klub Kadaň players
TMH Polonia Bytom players
Újpesti TE (ice hockey) players
Yertis Pavlodar players
Ice hockey people from Bratislava
Slovak expatriate ice hockey players in Sweden
Slovak expatriate ice hockey players in the Czech Republic
Slovak expatriate sportspeople in Kazakhstan
Slovak expatriate sportspeople in Hungary
Slovak expatriate sportspeople in Poland
Expatriate ice hockey players in Poland
Expatriate ice hockey players in Hungary
Expatriate ice hockey players in Kazakhstan